"Home" is a song written by Irish singer-songwriter Gemma Hayes for her third studio album The Hollow of Morning. This single was released as a promo single in 2008 a follow up to Out Of Our Hands.

A music video accompanied the track in 2009.

Music video
A music video for 'Home' was delayed due to tour commitments and after Hayes signed a deal in the US with Second Motion Records to release the album in North America. A video eventually appeared on her MySpace and YouTube pages on 22 February 2009. The video was shot in LA and has an ongoing theme of the Wizard of Oz.

References

Gemma Hayes songs
2009 singles
2007 songs
Songs written by Gemma Hayes